Fred Stolle and Lesley Turner defeated the reigning champions Ken Fletcher and Margaret Smith in the final, 6–4, 6–4 to win the mixed doubles tennis title at the 1964 Wimbledon Championships.

Seeds

  Ken Fletcher /  Margaret Smith (final)
  Fred Stolle /  Lesley Turner (champions)
  Bob Hewitt /  Maria Bueno (quarterfinals)
  Bob Howe /  Norma Baylon (third round, withdrew)

Draw

Finals

Top half

Section 1

Section 2

Section 3

Section 4

Bottom half

Section 5

Section 6

Section 7

Section 8

References

External links

X=Mixed Doubles
Wimbledon Championship by year – Mixed doubles